Evelina Josefine Hahne (born 12 July 1995) is a Swedish engineer and politician for Alternative for Sweden.

Early life 

Evelina Josefine Hahne was born on 12 July 1995 in Sollentuna, Stockholm, Sweden.

Political career 

In March 2022, she spoke in a panel at the Swedish Book and Media Fair.

In June 2022, it was announced that she would run on 10th place in the 2022 Swedish general election and on 3rd place in the 2022 Stockholm municipal election.

Home Guard scandal 

In January 2022, it was announced that she was discharged from the Home Guard because of her views.

Personal life 

On 21 November 2020, she married the former deputy leader of Alternative for Sweden William Hahne. On 28 December 2020, she gave birth to her first child Saga Alvilda Hahne. As of September 2022, she is pregnant with her second child.

References 

1995 births
Living people
Conservatism in Sweden
Critics of Islamism
Critics of multiculturalism
21st-century Swedish politicians
Swedish politicians
Alternative for Sweden politicians
People from Sollentuna Municipality
Politicians from Stockholm
Swedish nationalists
Swedish engineers
Linköping University alumni